Tickhill is a market town and civil parish in the City of Doncaster, South Yorkshire, England, close to the border with Nottinghamshire.  At the 2001 census it had a population of 5,301, reducing to 5,228 at the 2011 Census.

Geography
It lies eight miles south of Doncaster, between Maltby and Harworth, on the busy conjunction of the A631 and A60 roads, and adjacent to the A1(M) motorway. It is located at 53° 26' North, 1° 6' 40" West, at an elevation of around 20 metres above sea level. The River Torne passes close to the south-east of the town where it is the boundary between South Yorkshire and Nottinghamshire, eventually meeting the River Trent.

Notable buildings in Tickhill include the substantial ruins of Tickhill Castle which contain a private residence leased by the Duchy of Lancaster, St Mary's Church – a large 13th-century parish church, the parish room, an old hospital called St Leonard's, and the market cross.

Toponymy

"Tickhill" is an Old English place-name, meaning either "Hill where young goats are kept" or "Hill of man called Tica". It is composed of one of either ticce ("young goat") or the name Tica, and the word hyll. The village was not recorded in the Domesday Book but was recorded as Tikehill sometime in the 12th century.

History

William I
Shortly after the Norman Invasion, William I of England gave the lands around Tickhill to Roger de Busli, who built a castle on a small hill.  Richard de Busli, grandson of Roger's brother Arnold, co-founded nearby Roche Abbey with Richard FitzTurgis in 1147.

Middle Ages
During the Middle Ages, Tickhill was the second most important town, after Doncaster, in what is now South Yorkshire.  The Domesday Book lists the settlement under the former estate centre at Dadsley, now lying on the northern edge of the town.  Dadsley was served by a church atop All Hallows Hill, which by 1361 had been downgraded to a chapel.  Evidence suggests that the chapel was unused after the English Reformation, and was razed in the mid-17th century.

Tickhill's eponymous hill was probably the base of what is now the motte of Tickhill Castle.  The town grew up around the castle, and St Mary's was built soon after to replace All Hallows as the settlement's main church.

Initially, Tickhill was one of England's most successful new towns.  It gained a friary and St Leonard's Hospital.  The Guild of St Cross was established in the town, and it is believed to have acted as the settlement's main governing body.  In 1295, Tickhill sent two members to Parliament, but did not do so subsequently.

Sixteenth century
As castles declined in importance during the medieval period, so did Tickhill.  By the 16th century, only a hall was occupied on the castle site, but the market and an annual fair on St Lawrence's Day survived.  A little trade was gained from its position on the main road to Bawtry.  In 1777, a butter cross was erected in the marketplace in an attempt to revive the weekly market, but this ceased in the 1790s.

Strafforth and Tickhill was one of the wapentakes of the West Riding of Yorkshire. The Tickhill Psalter, an outstanding medieval illuminated manuscript was made in the Worksop Priory Nottinghamshire, is currently on display in New York City. It is named after John de Tickhill, born locally and who was made Prior of Worksop in the 14th century.

The following records from St Mary's Church, Tickhill are available at the Doncaster Archives:

 Baptisms 1542–1895
 Marriages 1538–1910
 Burials 1537–1901
 Banns 1798–1838
 Index: Baptisms 1542–1718, 1771–1839 
 Index: Marriages 1538–1677, 1754–1838 
 Index: Burials 1538–1674, 1771–1855 
 Bishop's transcripts 1600–1866

1900s
The Tickhill and Wadworth railway station was open from 1910 to 1929. There has been much debate whether to reopen this station.

Castle

Tickhill Castle was built by Roger de Busli, one of the most powerful of the first wave of Norman magnates who had come to England with William the Conqueror. The castle had an eventful history in national life. It was held for the usurping prince John against his brother King Richard I, when the latter returned from abroad in 1194, after his absence on crusade, was the site of a three-week siege during baronial conflicts in 1322. In the civil war of the 1640s, its importance as a local centre of resistance led to its ‘slighting’ (intentional disabling) by Parliament after the defeat of the royalist forces there in 1648. (Conisbrough, long disused as a fortress by this time, escaped such a fate.)

Amenities
There are the Tickhill Estfield and St Mary's C of E primary schools.

There are many traditional shops in Tickhill including a butchers, a fishmongers, and optician and a delicatessen.

There is also the millpond, now popular as a duckpond.

In 2002 a new public access wood was planted as a Queen's Jubilee project. 'Jubilee Wood' consists of 2002 native trees in 4 acres of land next to the River Torne, south of Tickhill (OS map reference SK 599917).

Flooding

Notable residents
 James Burbeary, cricketer
 William de Tickhill,  fourteenth-century civil servant and judge
 Francis Fletcher, a late 16th-century Vicar of Tickhill, accompanied Francis Drake on his circumnavigation of the world 
 Israel Tonge, informer in the "Popish" plot
 Jean Fergusson, actress playing Marina in Last of the Summer Wine
 Duggie Brown, comedian
 Gervase Phinn, author
 John Mayock, Olympic athlete
 John Regis, Olympic athlete
 Jeremy Clarkson, television presenter and Journalist
 Paul Warne, manager of Rotherham United

See also

Tickhill Psalter
Listed buildings in Tickhill

References

External links

 Tickhill Online
 Tickhill on the GENUKI genealogical site
 Tickhill & District Local History Society

 
Towns in South Yorkshire
Civil parishes in South Yorkshire